Thornburg Historic District is a historic district in Thornburg, Pennsylvania.  It was planned as a suburban development in the early 20th century and has 75 contributing buildings, all but one residential.  Though only 4 miles from downtown Pittsburgh, the district remains intact as an example of early suburban development.  The majority of houses were built in the Bungalow or Shingle styles, with others in the Queen Anne, Craftsman, Colonial, Mission or Tudor styles.

The Thornburg School was built in 1910 to the design of Press C. Dowler in the Mission style. It was used as a school until 1971 and continues to be used as a community center.

Cousins Frank and David Thornburg developed the approximately 250 acres, starting about 1900. The district was listed on the National Register of Historic Places on December 8, 1982.

References

Historic districts in Allegheny County, Pennsylvania
Historic districts on the National Register of Historic Places in Pennsylvania
National Register of Historic Places in Allegheny County, Pennsylvania